Asep Berlian (born 11 July 1990 in Bogor, Indonesia) is an Indonesian professional footballer who plays as a defensive midfielder for Liga 1 club Dewa United.

Club career

Persebaya Bhayangkara
On December 4, 2014, he moved to Persebaya Surabaya.

Madura United
He made his debut when against PS TNI in the first week 2016 Indonesia Soccer Championship B.

Dewa United
Berlian was signed for Dewa United to play in Liga 1 in the 2022–23 season. He made his league debut on 25 July 2022 in a match against Persis Solo at the Moch. Soebroto Stadium, Magelang.

References

External links
 Asep Berlian at Soccerway
 Asep Berlian at Liga Indonesia

Indonesian footballers
1990 births
Living people
People from Bogor
Sportspeople from West Java
Persik Kediri players
Bhayangkara F.C. players
Madura United F.C. players
Liga 1 (Indonesia) players
Association football midfielders
Dewa United F.C. players